Josef Hafellner (1951– ) is an Austrian mycologist and lichenologist. He was awarded the Acharius Medal in 2016 for his lifetime contributions to lichenology. Before his retirement, he was a professor at the Karl-Franzens-Universität in Graz. Hafellner started developing an interest in lichens while he was a student at this institution, studying under Josef Poelt. He earned a master's degree in 1975 and a PhD in 1978, defending a doctoral thesis about the genus Karschia. In 2003, Hafellner received his habilitation. By this time, he had studied with French lichenologist André Bellemère (1927–2014) at Saint-Cloud, where he learned techniques of transmission electron microscopy and how their application in studying asci could be used in lichen systematics. His 1984 work Studien in Richtung einer natürlicheren Gliederung der Sammelfamilien Lecanoraceae und Lecideaceae has been described as "probably the single most influential publication in lichen systematics in the latter half of the 20th century".

His research interests include the classification and taxonomy of lichens and  lichenicolous fungi and lichen floristics of the eastern European Alps. He has made about 100,000 scientific collections of specimens, including about 8000 lichenicolous fungi. Hafellner has introduced more than 600 scientific names to science, and as of 2016, authored or co-authored 289 scientific publications.

Eponymy
Hafellner has been honoured by having several taxa named after him, including five genera:
Fellhanera 
Fellhaneropsis 
Hafellia 
Hafellnera 
Henfellra 

The following species are also named after Hafellner:
Arthonia pepei ; Biatora hafellneri ; Biatoropsis hafellneri ; Caloplaca hafellneri ; Capronia hafellneri ; Capronia josefhafellneri ; Dactylospora hafellneriana ; Enterographa fellhaneroides ; Hypotrachyna hafellneri ; Malcolmiella fellhaneroides ; Megalaria hafellneriana ; Opegrapha hafellneri ; Phaeosporobolus fellhanerae ; Schismatomma hafellneri ; Stigmidium hafellneri ; Triblidium hafellneri ; Trichoconis hafellneri ; Xanthoparmelia hafellneri ; Xanthoria hafellneri .

Selected works
A complete listing of Hafellner's 289 scientific publications up to 2016 is given in Grube and colleagues' commemorative article. Hafellner's major works include the following:

References

Cited literature

1951 births
Austrian lichenologists
Austrian mycologists
Acharius Medal recipients
Austrian taxonomists
University of Graz alumni
Academic staff of the University of Graz
20th-century Austrian scientists
21st-century Austrian scientists
Living people